Karri Hietamäki (born 20 September 1969) is a Finnish cross-country skier who competed since 1992. He won a silver medal in the 4 × 10 km relay at the 1995 FIS Nordic World Ski Championships in Thunder Bay and earned his best individual finish of 14th at those same championships.

Hietamäki's best individual finish at the Winter Olympics was 31st in the 50 km event at Salt Lake City in 2002. He also earned two victories in Finland during his career (1994, 1997)

Cross-country skiing results
All results are sourced from the International Ski Federation (FIS).

Olympic Games

World Championships
 1 medal – (1 silver)

World Cup

Season standings

Team podiums

 3 victories 
 5 podiums

Note:   Until the 1999 World Championships, World Championship races were included in the World Cup scoring system.

References

External links 

1969 births
Living people
Finnish male cross-country skiers
Cross-country skiers at the 1994 Winter Olympics
Cross-country skiers at the 2002 Winter Olympics
FIS Nordic World Ski Championships medalists in cross-country skiing
Olympic cross-country skiers of Finland
People from Isokyrö
Sportspeople from Ostrobothnia (region)
20th-century Finnish people